The Showgirl (Spanish: La corista) is a 1960 Spanish musical film directed by José María Elorrieta and starring Marujita Díaz, Espartaco Santoni and Luis Sánchez Polack.

Cast
 Marujita Díaz as Marieta  
 Espartaco Santoni as Alfredo  
 Luis Sánchez Polack as Periodista  
 Joaquín Portillo 'Top' as Fotógrafo 
 Rafael Corés 
 Manolo Gómez Bur as Felipe  
 Guadalupe Muñoz Sampedro as Clara 
 Paquito Cano as Sebastián  
 Félix Fernández as Pulino  
 Eduardo Hernández 
 Mara Laso as Rosa  
 Antonio Molino Rojo 
 Julia Pachelo 
 Antonio Riquelme as Novio de Rosa  
 José María Tasso as Pedro  
 José Villasante as Inspector de policía 
 Manuel Zarzo

References

Bibliography 
 Crusells, Magi. Directores de cine en Cataluña: de la A a la Z. Edicions Universitat Barcelona, 2009.

External links 
 

1960 musical films
Spanish musical films
1960 films
1960s Spanish-language films
Films directed by José María Elorrieta
Films scored by Gregorio García Segura
1960s Spanish films